iRiver iFP was a series of small flash memory digital audio players from iRiver. It started out with the "Prism" iFP-100 series, the company's first ever digital audio player, in 2002. This was followed by six new entries in the line, until its replacement by the iriver T series (the T30 and T10) in 2005.

Reception 
The iFP-100 and iFP-300 were successful products. They formed a sort of de facto industry standard and pushed other manufacturers away from expandable memory, in favour of high-capacity flash.

Specifications and comparison

References 

Digital audio players
IRiver
Consumer electronics
Products introduced in 2002